The Concerto Mediterraneo is a concerto for classical guitar and orchestra by the American composer Steven Stucky.  The work was completed in April 1998 and was written to commemorate the life of the Greek guitarist Sophocles Papas.  It was first performed on September 17, 1998 at the Joseph Meyerhoff Symphony Hall in Baltimore by the guitarist Manuel Barrueco and the Baltimore Symphony Orchestra under the conductor Günther Herbig.

Composition

Background
Stucky was approached to compose the concerto as a tribute to the guitarist Sophocles Papas at the request of Papas's daughter, Elizabeth Papas Smith, and Dr. Solomon H. Snyder, a former student of Papas.  Stucky began work on the piece in late 1997, composing the third movement during a stay at the Italian Riviera.  He subsequently wrote the finale and introductory movements in Ithaca, New York and completed the work on April 8, 1998.

Structure
The Concerto Mediterraneo has a duration of roughly 20 minutes and is composed in four movements:
Serenata
Interludio
Ciaccona notturna
Finale

Instrumentation
The work is scored for solo guitar and an orchestra comprising two flutes, two oboes, two clarinets, two bassoons, two French horns, trumpet, trombone, timpani, two percussionists, harp, and strings.

Reception
Reviewing the world premiere, Pierre Ruhe of The Washington Post lauded the concerto, writing:
Stephen Wigler of The Baltimore Sun was more critical, however, calling it "disappointing" and remarking, "Stucky tried to provide Barrueco with opportunities for intimacy in the first two movements by presenting the guitar in chamber-music-like settings and even in duets with other instruments. Unfortunately, it was often the scoring for the other instruments that kept the ear in anticipation."  Despite this criticism, Wigler added:

References

Concertos by Steven Stucky
1998 compositions
Guitar concertos